Matea Mezak (born 5 March 1985) is a Croatian former professional tennis player. 2004, she started on the ITF Circuit, where she won six singles and six doubles titles.

Her preferred surface is hardcourt, and her coach was Ivan Humić.

Along with Svetlana Kuznetsova, she reached 2002 Australian Open junior doubles competition, where they lost to Indonesian Angelique Widjaja and Argentine Gisela Dulko.

Mezak also was on the Croatia Fed Cup team, in 2005 and 2006.

In April 2014, she played her last match on the pro circuit.

ITF Circuit finals

Singles: 12 (6–6)

Doubles: 14 (6–8)

References

External links
 
 

Croatian female tennis players
Tennis players from Zagreb
1985 births
Living people
Mediterranean Games silver medalists for Croatia
Mediterranean Games bronze medalists for Croatia
Mediterranean Games medalists in tennis
Competitors at the 2005 Mediterranean Games
21st-century Croatian women